Quercus argentata is an evergreen tropical oak species in the beech family Fagaceae. There are no known subspecies. It is placed in subgenus Cerris, section Cyclobalanopsis. It derived its name from the silvery hairs on the lower surface of its leaves.

The species is distributed in Borneo, Sumatra including Bangka, the peninsula of Malaysia, and western Java. It can grow 10 meters and up heights of 40 meters.

Distribution and habitat
Quercus argentata is native to the islands of Sumatra, Borneo (though absent in Brunei), and Western Java, as well as to Peninsular Malaysia. This oak is found on Mount Kinabalu in lower montane forests up to an elevation of 2,700 m above sea level.

It occurs up to 3,350 meters above sea level in lowland  mixed  dipterocarp  to  montane  forests, but is most commonly found between 600-1,500 meters on sandy clay or sandy loam soils.

Within its region can be found 20-25 other Quercus species with Q. nivea being most similar in appearance and distribution.

References

External links

 
 

argentata
Flora of Indo-China
Trees of Borneo
Flora of Peninsular Malaysia
Flora of Sumatra
Flora of Java
Flora of the Borneo montane rain forests